Boris Fyodorovich Schlözer (Schloezer) (Russian: Борис Фёдорович Шлёцер, sometimes a transliteration of Boris Fëdorovič Šlëcer or Boris de Šlëcer, born in Vitebsk 8 December 1881 – died in Paris 7 October 1969), was a writer, musicologist and French translator of Russian origin.

Life and career
A descendant of the Russian branch of a German noble family, he emigrated to France after the October Revolution. He took part in the Nouvelle Revue Française and translated many Russian authors, among them Gogol, Dostoevsky, Rozanov and especially his friend Lev Shestov, whom he helped to diffuse his philosophy in France.  Passionate about music, he wrote monographs on composers, sometimes in collaboration with his niece Marina Scriabina and his sister Tatiana Schlözer (1883–1922), who was Marina’s mother and the mistress of Alexander Scriabin.

Schloezer's Introduction à J.-S. Bach outlines a phenomenological approach to music, and is in agreement with contemporary gestalt music theories. He wrote prolifically on Stravinsky, including one of the first biographies of the composer. Schloezer's writings were influential for Boulez and his generation, though Schloezer occasionally criticized Boulez, for example in his 1955 article "Retour à Descartes."

Works

 Igor Stravinsky (1929)
 Gogol (1932)
 Introduction à J.-S. Bach; essai d'esthétique musicale (1947)
 "Retour à Descartes" (1955)
 Problèmes de la musique moderne [with Marina Scriabine, his niece] (1959)
 Mon nom est personne, roman (1969)
 Alexandre Scriabin (1975)

Translations from Russian to French
 Dostoïevski et la lutte contre les évidences de Léon Chestov (1922)
 La Confession de Stavroguine de Dostoïevski (1922)
 La Guerre et la Paix de Tolstoï
 Le Diable de Tolstoï

Notes

References

20th-century Russian writers
Russian writers in French
20th-century French non-fiction writers
Russian–French translators
Russian musicologists
Writers from Vitebsk
1881 births
1969 deaths
20th-century musicologists
20th-century translators